Bohdan Olehovych Biloshevskyi (born 12 January 2000) is a Ukrainian professional football defender who plays for Oleksandriya on loan from Dynamo Kyiv.

Career

Early years
Born in Nizhyn, Biloshevskyi began his career in the local Nizhyn youth sportive school, until his transfer to the Dynamo Kyiv academy in 2011. He played in the Ukrainian Premier League Reserves and never made his debut for the senior Dynamo Kyiv squad.

Dynamo Kyiv
In May 2021, he returned to Dynamo Kyiv.

Loan to Desna Chernihiv
In January 2021 Drambayev signed one-year loan contract with the Ukrainian Premier League's side FC Desna Chernihiv and made the debut for this team as a start squad player in a away match against FC Zorya Luhansk on 13 February 2021.

Loan Chornomorets Odesa
In summer time he moved on loan to Chornomorets Odesa and on 25 July 2021, he made his debut in Ukrainian Premier League with the new club against Desna Chernihiv at the Stadion Yuri Gagarin and he was sent off at the 39 minute of the first half for a second yellow card.

References

External links
 
 

2000 births
Living people
Footballers from Nizhyn
Ukrainian footballers
Ukraine youth international footballers
Ukraine under-21 international footballers
Association football defenders
FC Dynamo Kyiv players
FC Desna Chernihiv players
FC Chornomorets Odesa players
FC Oleksandriya players
Ukrainian Premier League players